Sarah Milette (born April 11, 1997) is a Canadian trampoline gymnast. In 2018, Milette and Rosie MacLennan won the silver medal in the women's synchro event at the 2018 Trampoline Gymnastics World Championships held in Saint Petersburg, Russia.

She represented Canada at the 2019 Pan American Games in Lima, Peru in the women's individual event without winning a medal.

At the 2019 Trampoline World Championships held in Tokyo, Japan she won, alongside Sophiane Méthot, Samantha Smith and Rosie MacLennan, the bronze medal in the women's team event with a score of 133.745.

References

External links 
 

Living people
1997 births
Place of birth missing (living people)
Canadian female trampolinists
Pan American Games competitors for Canada
Gymnasts at the 2019 Pan American Games
Medalists at the Trampoline Gymnastics World Championships